Ozerki is a rural locality (a village) in Shevchenkovsky Selsoviet, Meleuzovsky District, Bashkortostan, Russia. The population was 127 as of 2010. There are 2 streets.

Geography 
Ozerki is located 17 km southwest of Meleuz (the district's administrative centre) by road. Antonovka is the nearest rural locality.

References 

Rural localities in Meleuzovsky District